Bicyclus ephorus, the common blue-banded bush brown, is a butterfly in the family Nymphalidae. It is found in Guinea, Sierra Leone, Liberia, Ivory Coast, Ghana, Nigeria, Cameroon, the Republic of the Congo, the Central African Republic and the Democratic Republic of the Congo. The habitat consists of forests.

Adults are attracted to fermented fruit.

The larvae feed on Trachyphrynium species.

Subspecies
Bicyclus ephorus ephorus (Guinea, Sierra Leone, Liberia, Ivory Coast, Ghana, Nigeria)
Bicyclus ephorus bergeri Condamin, 1965 (Cameroon, Congo, Central African Republic, northern Democratic Republic of the Congo)

References

Elymniini
Butterflies described in 1892
Butterflies of Africa